Newhouse or New House may refer to:

Places
United Kingdom
 New House, County Durham, England
 Newhouse, North Lanarkshire, Scotland
United States
 Newhouse, Minnesota, an unincorporated community
 Newhouse, Utah, a ghost town

Other uses
 Newhouse Academy
 Newhouse (surname)

See also
 S. I. Newhouse School of Public Communications
 Mitzi E. Newhouse Theater
 Newhouse News refers to the Advance Publications family of news publications
 Several of MicroProse's Formula One racing games in the late 1990s replaced 1997 Formula One World Champion Jacques Villeneuve with the fictional John Newhouse (an approximate translation of his name), as licensing restrictions prevented his name from being used
 Neuhaus (disambiguation)